The 2004 FIBA Europe Under-16 Championship was the 18th edition of the FIBA Europe Under-16 Championship. The cities of Amaliada and Pyrgos, in Greece, hosted the tournament. France won the trophy for the first time. Georgia and Germany were relegated to Division B.

Teams

System of competition
The tournament format changed with the inclusion of the Division System. The sixteen teams from Division A entered the tournament. In the preliminary round, the sixteen teams were allocated in four groups of four teams each. The two top teams from each group qualify for the quarterfinals. The eight teams were allocated on two groups of four teams each, with the two top teams qualifying for the semifinals. The two teams qualified 15th and 16th were relegated to Division B.

Preliminary round

Group A

Group B

Group C

Group D

Classification round

Group G

Group H

Quarterfinals round

Group E

Group F

Knockout stage

13th–16th playoffs

Georgia and Germany were relegated to Division B.

9th–12th playoffs

5th–8th playoffs

Championship

Final standings

References
FIBA Archive
FIBA Europe Archive

FIBA U16 European Championship
2004–05 in European basketball
2004–05 in Greek basketball
International youth basketball competitions hosted by Greece